William Stevens Powell (April 28, 1919 – April 10, 2015) was an American historian, writer, academic, and teacher. He authored over 600 articles and books about the history of North Carolina and was the editor of the six volume Dictionary of North Carolina Biography.  He was professor emeritus of history at the University of North Carolina at Chapel Hill, having retired in 1986.

Early life
William was born on  April 28, 1919 in Johnston County, North Carolina in a house built by his great-grandfather along the Neuse River between Smithfield and Goldsboro.  He was the son of Isaac Millard Powell (1892-1955) and Ada Belle Perry Powell (1895-1982).  In 1920, his family moved to Statesville, North Carolina where his father gained employment with the State Highway and Public Works Commission.  His mother was employed as a school teacher in Iredell County.  William finished high school in Statesville and attended Mitchell College in Statesville for two years and then transferred to the University of North Carolina at Chapel Hill.  He earned a bachelor's degree in history in 1940.

Career
After college William worked briefly for the Statesville Record and began writing his first articles about North Carolina history for the Our State magazine.  When World War II started, he enlisted in the U.S. Army and was stationed at Fort Knox, Kentucky and served overseas in the Philippines and Japan.  After the war, he returned to Statesville and worked briefly at the Statesville Record before enrolling at the University of North Carolina, where he received a degree in library science in 1947.  After graduation, he worked briefly as a librarian at Yale University in the Rare Book Room before returning to North Carolina to take a job in Raleigh, North Carolina at the North Carolina Division of Archives and History.  His job was to write text for the North Carolina historical markers.   In Raleigh he met Virginia Penn Waldrop, whom he married in 1952.  Virginia would also become his valued research assistant in his historical research.

In 1951, he began working as a librarian at the University of North Carolina in the library's North Carolina Collection, where he became curator of the collection in 1958.  He made a major effort to expand the collection of historic documents about North Carolina and the people of North Carolina.

Early in his professional career, he focused on the colonial and early history of North Carolina.  In 1956, Powell received a Guggenheim Fellowship to study U.S. history.  During this fellowship, he traveled to England and conducted research on the Roanoke Colony in colonial North Carolina.

In 1972, he left this position and to become a professor of North Carolina history at the University of North Carolina at Chapel Hill. He remained in this position until 1986 when he retired to devote more time to research and writing.  During his teaching career, he taught over 6,000 students.

Awards and works

He received the North Carolina Award for literature in 2000 and was inducted into the North Carolina Literary Hall of Fame in 2008.  He won the Mayflower Cup for Nonfiction in 1989 for his book, North Carolina Through Four Centuries.

He inspired others to contribute to the books that he edited, such as the Dictionary of North Carolina biography, and also contributed many of the articles.  He authored over 600 articles and books in his career. His works included:
 
 
 
 
 
 
 
 
 : Volume 1, A-C (1979), Volume 2, D-G (1986), Volume 3, H-K (1988), Volume 4, L-O (1991), Volume 5, P-S (1994), Volume 6, T-Z (1996)

Death and family
Powell died on April 10, 2015, aged 95. He was survived by his wife, Virginia. He had three children and 11 grandchildren.

References

External links
 The Heritage Center – William S. Powell Collection
 University of North Carolina Press – North Carolina, a History
 Bookwatch Blog, Tuesday, November 06, 2007. William S. Powell Shares His Landmark Publication, Encyclopedia of North Carolina On UNC-TV’s North Carolina Bookwatch, Friday, November 16, at 9:30 PM!
 Endeavors, Spring 2007. N.C., A to Z. Review by Jason Smith of Encyclopedia of North Carolina, edited by William S. Powell.

1919 births
2015 deaths
American historians
University of North Carolina at Chapel Hill faculty
People from Statesville, North Carolina